Halsey Field House is a multi-purpose arena at the United States Naval Academy, in Annapolis, Maryland, with a seating capacity of 5,000. It was home to the Navy Midshipmen men's basketball team until the Alumni Hall opened in 1991. It is named after FADM William "Bull" Halsey, a World War II United States Navy commander.

Currently it is the home of the indoor track and field teams. It contains a 200-meter synthetic track, squash and tennis courts, a 65 tatami dojo for Aikido/Judo, and a climbing wall.

The North Wing has five basketball courts, five squash courts, dressing rooms, a conditioning room, classrooms for physical education, athletic-gear storage, and office space for instructors.

The weight room is one of three "strength and conditioning facilities" at the academy. With , it serves men's and women's basketball, men's and women's crew, men's and women's swimming, and squash.

See also

Footnotes

External links
 Halsey Field House official webpage. USNA Athletics official webpage. Retrieved 2010-02-13.

Sports venues completed in 1957
Athletics (track and field) venues in Maryland
Indoor arenas in Maryland
Indoor track and field venues in the United States
College indoor track and field venues in the United States
Defunct college basketball venues in the United States
Sports venues in Maryland
Navy Midshipmen basketball venues
Navy Midshipmen track and field
United States Naval Academy buildings and structures